Esch is a surname. Notable people with the surname include:

Arno Esch (1928-1951), German politician 
Edward Esch (born 1970), lyricist for, and possibly pseudonym of, composer Eric Whitacre
En Esch (born 1968), German musician
Eric Esch (born 1966), American boxer better known as Butterbean
Jake Esch (born 1990), American baseball player 
Jan van Essen (died 1523), one of the first two Lutheran martyrs
John J. Esch (1861–1941)
Marvin L. Esch (1927–2010), U.S. Representative from Michigan
Mathilde Esch (1815–1904), Austrian genre painter
Natasha Esch, Canadian model 
Nicolaus van Esch (1507–1578), Dutch theologian
Vincent Esch (1876–1950), British architect

See also
Von der Esch, surname
Oesch, surname
Eash, surname